Group 2 of the 1966 FIFA World Cup consisted of Argentina, West Germany, Spain, and Switzerland. Play began on 12 July 1966 and concluded on 20 July 1966. West Germany won the group and Argentina finished as runners-up, and both advanced to the quarter-finals. Spain and Switzerland failed to advance.

Standings

Matches

West Germany vs Switzerland

Argentina vs Spain

Spain vs Switzerland

|

|}

Argentina vs West Germany

Argentina vs Switzerland

West Germany vs Spain

References

External links
 1966 FIFA World Cup archive

1966 FIFA World Cup
West Germany at the 1966 FIFA World Cup
Argentina at the 1966 FIFA World Cup
Spain at the 1966 FIFA World Cup
Switzerland at the 1966 FIFA World Cup